Triphenylphosphine dichloride, Ph3PCl2, is a chlorinating agent widely used in organic chemistry. Applications include the conversion of alcohols and ethers to alkyl chlorides, the cleavage of epoxides to vicinal dichlorides and the chlorination of carboxylic acids to acyl chlorides.

Structure 
In polar solvents such as acetonitrile, Ph3PCl2 adopts an ionic phosphonium salt structure, [Ph3PCl+]Cl−, whereas in non-polar solvents like diethyl ether it exists as a non-solvated trigonal bipyramidal molecule. Two [Ph3PCl+] species can also adopt an unusual dinuclear ionic structure—both interacting with a Cl− via long Cl–Cl contacts.

Synthesis 
Triphenylphosphine dichloride is usually prepared fresh by the addition of chlorine to triphenylphosphine.

Ph3P + Cl2 → Ph3PCl2

Both reagents are typically used in solution to ensure the correct stoichiometry.

Ph3PCl2 can also be obtained by the reaction of iodobenzene dichloride (PhICl2) and triphenylphosphine.

Alternatively, Ph3PCl2 can be obtained by chlorination of triphenylphosphine oxide with, for example, phosphorus trichloride, as in Grignard's original 1931 synthesis.

References 

Reagents for organic chemistry
Phenyl compounds
Organophosphorus compounds